is a song by Japanese singer-songwriter Rina Aiuchi. It was released on 15 October 2008 through Giza Studio, as the lead single from her seventh studio album Thanx. The single reached number twenty in Japan and has sold over 8,256 copies nationwide. The song served as the theme songs to the Japanese television show, Nihonshi Suspense Gekijo.

Track listing

Charts

Certification and sales

|-
! scope="row"| Japan (RIAJ)
| 
| 8,256 
|-
|}

Release history

References

2008 singles
2008 songs
J-pop songs
Song recordings produced by Daiko Nagato
Songs written by Rina Aiuchi